Seyyedabad in Tehran Province may refer to:
 Seyyedabad, Damavand, a village in Damavand County